Jean Paelinck (1906–1961) was a Belgian colonial administrator. In the Belgian Congo he was appointed governor of Kasaï Province in 1955, then Katanga Province in 1956.

Early years

Jean Henri Paelinck was born in Hasselt in 1906.
His parents were Henri Paelinck, an accountant, and Irène Dumoulin, a  seamstress. 
He was the first child and only boy, but had three sisters.
He studied at the Royal Athenaeum and then at the Koloniale Hogeschool in Antwerp, graduating in 1928.
He married Elvira Alexina Coopman on 30 July 1928.

Colonial career

Paelinck left for the Congo in September 1928.
He moved through the ranks.
In 1949 he was appointed district commissioner of Lusambo.
In 1950 he was transferred to Kabinda District.
He was made provincial secretary in Lusambo and Jadotstad in 1951, and in Elisabethville in 1953.
In 1954 Paelinck was appointed provincial commissioner in Elisabethville.

Paelinck succeeded Roger Le Bussy as governor of Kasaï Province on 20 April 1955.
He left office on 27 September 1955, and was succeeded by Antoine Lamborelle.
In January 1956 he succeeded René Wauthion as governor of Katanga Province.
He held office until September 1958, when he was succeeded by André Schöller.

Last years

Paelinck returned to Belgium in 1958.
He settled in Brussels, where he died in 1961.

Notes

Sources

1906 births
1961 deaths
People from Hasselt
Governors of Kasaï (former province)
Governors of Katanga Province